The Muang Thai Chiang Mai Marathon is held every late December in Chiang Mai, Thailand. It is the largest annual road racing event held in Chiang Mai. Its title sponsor is Muang Thai Life Assurance. It was first founded by Mercy School alumni.

In 2017, there were more than 6,000 participants.

Past winners
Key:

Marathon

References

External links 
Muang Thai Chiang Mai Marathon official website

Marathons in Thailand
Sport in Chiang Mai